Lee Sang-hee (born Lee Na-ri; October 8, 1983) is a South Korean actress. She first became known for her role in the film End of Winter (2014). She later rose to prominence and gained recognition for her role in the film Our Love Story (2016). She also appeared in television series such as Children of the 20th Century (2017) and One Spring Night (2019).

Filmography

Film

Television series

Web series

Hosting

Music video

Awards and nominations

References

1983 births
Living people
South Korean film actresses
South Korean television actresses
21st-century South Korean actresses
People from Ulsan
Best New Actress Paeksang Arts Award (film) winners